The Spencer Gulf Football League is an Australian rules football competition based at the head of the Spencer Gulf in South Australia. It is an affiliated member of the South Australian National Football League.

The Spencer Gulf Football League was formed in 1961, via a merger of the Port Pirie Football League (PPFL), the Whyalla Football League (WFL), and the Port Augusta-based Great Northern Football Association (GNFA). At the end of the 1966 season the WFL contingent withdrew.

Brief history 
In 1961 the Great Northern Football Association, the Port Pirie Football Association and the Whyalla Football League merged to form the Spencer Gulf Football League. The twelve founding clubs were Central Augusta, Central Whyalla, North Whyalla, Port, Proprietary, Risdon, Solomontown, South Augusta, South Whyalla, West Augusta, West Whyalla and Willsden.

The four Whyalla-based clubs left the Spencer Gulf Football League at the end of season 1966 to form the Whyalla Football League, leaving 8 teams from Port Augusta and Port Pirie.

In 1992 Willsden amalgamated with Quorn to form Quorn-Willsden Wolves. The league reverted to 7 teams in 1994 when Proprietary and Risdon amalgamated. In 2006 the league was cut down to 6 teams when the Quorn-Willsden Wolves folded due to financial woes.

Current clubs

Previous clubs

Premierships 

 1961 – Port
 1962 – South Whyalla
 1963 – West Whyalla
 1964 – South Augusta
 1965 – Port
 1966 – Port
 1967 – Port
 1968 – Proprietary
 1969 – West Augusta
 1970 – Port
 1971 – Proprietary
 1972 – West Augusta
 1973 – West Augusta
 1974 – West Augusta
 1975 – West Augusta
 1976 – West Augusta
 1977 – Proprietary
 1978 – Central Augusta
 1979 – Risdon
 1980 – Central Augusta
 1981 – South Augusta
 1982 – Central Augusta
 1983 – South Augusta
 1984 – Solomontown
 1985 – West Augusta
 1986 – Willsden
 1987 – West Augusta
 1988 – Solomontown
 1989 – West Augusta
 1990 – Solomontown
 1991 – Central Augusta
 1992 – Central Augusta
 1993 – South Augusta
 1994 – South Augusta
 1995 – Solomontown
 1996 – West Augusta
 1997 – Port
 1998 – Port
 1999 – Port
 2000 – South Augusta
 2001 – Quorn-Willsden
 2002 – Port
 2003 – Port
 2004 – Port
 2005 – West Augusta
 2006 – South Augusta
 2007 – Port
 2008 – Port
 2009 – Central Augusta
 2010 – Central Augusta
 2011 – Central Augusta
 2012 – South Augusta
 2013 – West Augusta
 2014 – Solomontown
 2015 – Lions 
 2016 – South Augusta
 2017 – South Augusta
 2018 – South Augusta
 2019 – South Augusta
 2020 - South Augusta
 2021 - Lions

Madigan Medallist & Ken Mitchell Awards

AFL representatives 

The Spencer Gulf League has been home to many AFL Footballers including:

 Greg Flanegan (1981)
 Mark Bickley (Adelaide Crows, 1991–2003) played his junior football for the Solomontown Football club and was a premiership player with the club in 1988, in that same year he won the Madigan Medal at the age of 19. Mark moved to the South Adelaide Football Club in the South Australian National Football League (SANFL), where he was then selected as an inaugural member of the Adelaide Crows squad in 1991. In 1997 Bickley was appointed captain of the Adelaide Football Club, and captained the 1997 and 1998 Adelaide premiership sides. He is now a member of the SANFL Hall of Fame.
 Bryan Beinke (Adelaide Crows, 1999–2002)
 Jared Rivers  (Melbourne Demons, 2003–present) played junior football for the South Augusta Bulldogs Football club and won a premiership with the club in 2000 at the age of 15. Jared was selected by the Melbourne Demons as the 26th pick overall in the National Draft of 2002. In 2004 he won the National Bank Rising Star.
 Mark Jamar (Melbourne Demons, 2003–present) played his early football at the Lions Football Club before moving to North Adelaide in the SANFL. Mark was selected at pick 6 of the 2001 Rookie Draft by the Melbourne Demons. In 2010 he was named as the second ruckman for the All-Australian squad.
 Elijah Ware (Port Adelaide, 2005–2006)
 Wade Thompson (Port Adelaide, 2009–2010)
 Lewis Johnston (Sydney Swans/Adelaide, 2009–present)
Luke Taylor (Melbourne),1998–2000
 Connor Rozee (Port Adelaide, 2019-present)

Grand Final results 

Grand Final  on 19 September 2015
Lions	5.4	8.6	11.11	16.15 (111)
Central	1.1	2.3	6.8	9.11 (65)
Best: Lions – T. Dunkley, R. Eyre, T. Harmer, J. Fuller, T. Bradley. Central – G. Appleton, A. Ruffles, A. Parsons, M. Harvey, M. Fuller. Goals: Lions – T. Bradley 4, J. Fuller 2, J. Strawbridge 2, S. Dyer, K. Edwards, T. Ley, A. Slattery, C. Marsland, L. Patterson, S. Edwards, T. Dunkley. Central – J. Reid 4, J. Muirhead 2, M. Harvey, A. Hosking, G. Appleton

Grand Final on 20 September 2014 
West	1.4	1.7	4.9	7.11 (53)
Solomontown	1.2	4.6	6.7	8.10 (58)
Best: Sollies – L. Bearman, B. Schutte, Z. Siemer, G. Cooke, R. Hoare. West  – not av. Goals: Sollies – M. OBrien 2, K. Head 2, J. Head, L. Bearman, T. Hoare, B. Mudge. West – H. Warren 5, T. Starke-Treloar 2

 21 September 2013 
West	3.4	9.6	12.7	16.8 (104)
Central	2.1	4.1	9.2	15.6 (96)
Best: West – J. Jackson, T. Warren, S. Page, N. Collins, R. Dadleh. Central – L. Button, M. Fuller, M. Turner, N. Callary, S. Watts. Goals: West – S. Page 6, T. Starke-Treloar 2, H. Warren 2, N. Collins 2, M. Anesbury 2, R. Stapleton, J. Coulthard. Central – L. Button 4, D. Shillabeer 3, J. Reid 2, A. Ruffles 2, M. Harvey, M. Turner, J. Little, S. Watts

22 September 2012 
South	3.3	5.4	10.8	15.8 (98)
Sollies	2.5	3.7	8.10	9.12 (66)
Best: South – A. Margitich, M. Horner, R. Struck, B. Hurt, B. Laube, S. Brusnahan . Sollies – J. Davies, C. Millard, R. Saracino, Z. Siemer, S. Malchow. . Goals: South – B. Trewartha 3, B. Cox 2, T. Kernahan 2, C. Heron 2, D. Dohnt 2, L. Schmidt, J. Lukich, M. Horner, T. Payne. Sollies – S. McIntyre 2, J. Davies 2, B. Goodridge, N. Redman, L. Bearman, C. Millard, T. Hoare

24 September 2011
Central	4.3	7.5	9.7	11.10 (76)
Port	1.0	4.0	6.1	8.3 (51)
Best: Central – G. Kenny, P. Byron-Boles, R. Morris, S. Watts, C. Johnston. Port – J. Penny, C. Stephens, N. Magor, C. Brooke, C. Smith. Goals: Central – R. Morris 6, J. Reid, M. Woolford, L. Donald, D. Shillabeer, P. Byron-Boles. Port – G. Phillips 2, A. Casey 2, C. Smith 2, M. Gale, B. Mudge

18 September 2010
Central                    1.1     6.2      9.3     11.4 (70)
South                       2.7     4.7      7.15   7.17 (59)
Best: Central – N. Callary, J. Jackson, R. Morris, P. Jackson, J. Reid. South – B. Jones, D. Dohnt, B. Cox, M. Gill, M. Curley. Goals: Central – R. Morris 5, A. Grantham, G. Hull, P. Byron-Boles, D. Shillabeer, P. Jackson, K. McKenzie . South – B. Cox 2, S. Feltus, C. Reid, C. Heron, B. Jones, T. Kernahan

2009

Central 12.6 (78) def Port 8.15 (63)
 Best: Central – M Fuller, J Dodd, A Fullerton, J Quigley, S Dawson. Port – C Stephens, T Clarke, K Johnanson, C Smith, M Burford.
 Goals: Central – R Morris 3, S Dawson, J Reid 2, R Clayton-Waye, S Curnow, M Fuller, M Harvey, A McKenzie. Port – G Phillips 3, S Treloar, T Clarke, J Clarke, M Gale

2008

Port 10.10 (70) def Central 8.21 (69)
 Best: Port – A Casey, M Burford, N Wombat, A Featherstonaugh, J Coombe. Central – A Williams, N Callary, T O’Connor, L Rathman, M Keatley.
 Goals: Port – G Phillips 4, N Wombat 3, J Coombe 2, A Casey. Central – S Dawson, S Wilson, M Fuller, D Baker, J Dodd, K Allen, N Lawrence

2007

Port 16.8 (104) def West 11.15 (81)

 Best: Port – N Wombat, S Treloar, M Burford, A Waters, C Stephens. West – Not Available.
 Goals: Port – B Mudge, A Bergsma 3, S Treloar, J Coombe 2, L Copley, A Fleming, S Humphreys, M Kendall. West – R McDonald, J Coulthard, R Dadleh 2, R Stapledon, C McKenzie, J Carn, H Warren, M Benbow

2006

South 16.13 (109) def Central 7.6 (48)
 Best: South – D Crombie, C Reid, G O’Brien, R Barnes. Central – S McIntyre, M Fuller, B Page, C Pannach
 Goals: South – B Amos 7, D Shillabeer 3, C Heron 2, B Jones, A Grantham, M Grantham, G O’Brien. Central – A Ruffles 3, J Harland 2, D Baker, M Kieboom

 2007 Ladder 

 2008 Ladder 

 2009 Ladder 

 2010 Ladder 

 2011 Ladder 

 2012 Ladder 

 2013 Ladder 

 2014 Ladder 

 2015 Ladder 

 2016 Ladder 

 2017 Ladder 

Bibliography
 Encyclopedia of South Australian country football clubs, compiled by Peter Lines. 
 South Australian country football digest'', by Peter Lines

References

External links 
 
 Gameday website

Eyre Peninsula
Australian rules football competitions in South Australia